Regina Engelina Maria (Giny) Vos (born 30 October 1959) is a Dutch visual and conceptual artist.  She has made almost thirty monumental works of art for public spaces.

Life 
Vos graduated from the Gerrit Rietveld Academy in Amsterdam in 1988 and studied sculpture at the Rijksakademie van Beeldende Kunsten from 1988 to 1990. In one of the earliest presentations of Dutch video art, Vos was represented in a 1990 exhibition entitled "Imago, fin de siècle" alongside artists Jeffrey Shaw, Lydia Schouten, Boris Gerrets, and Madelon Hooykaas among others. In 2004, she received the Witteveen+Bos Prize for Art+Technology for her oeuvre.

Selected works

References

External links 
 

 
Dutch contemporary artists
1959 births
Living people